Manguna Airport is an airfield serving Manguna, in the East New Britain Province of Papua New Guinea.

References

External links
 

Airports in Papua New Guinea
East New Britain Province